Lobogonodes is a genus of moths in the family Geometridae erected by Max Bastelberger in 1909.

Species
Lobogonodes complicata (Butler, 1879)
Lobogonodes erectaria (Leech, 1897)
Lobogonodes multistriata (Butler, 1889)
Lobogonodes permarmorata (Bastelberger, 1909)
Lobogonodes porphyriata (Moore, 1888)
Lobogonodes taiwana (Wileman & South, 1917)

References

Cidariini